In the Land of Poison Women, also known as Bishkanyar Deshot, is a 2019 Pangchenpa language feature film from India by Manju Borah. The story is based on distinguished litterateur Yeshe Dorjee Thongchi’s much acclaimed work. The language Pangchenpa is used by Monpa tribe with a population of just around 5000, settled near the India-China border region, some hundred kilometres West of Tawang in Arunachal Pradesh, India.

Plot
Sangra and Lusang's two children and four others die after consuming a local wine that was prepared by Lusang. She is ostracised by her community over their superstitious belief of her being a doumoh – a poison woman.

Filming
The film was shot at picturesque locations of lower and upper Himalaya, in Arunachal Pradesh, India. The 30 people crew and equipment came from Bombay and Guwahati and took four days to reach the shoot location crossing Sela Pass which is the world's second highest motorable road.

The director was not familiar with the language, she had to learn the language, and also used a language assistant to direct and edit the film.

Awards

Cast
 Dondup Drema
 Kendan Tashi
 Lobsang Drema
kesang wangda
oggy tatsumi
Ayano kiyoshi

References

2019 films